Skeidsnutane Peaks is a group of peaks, including Hånuten Peak, that extend south for about 6 nautical miles (11 km) from Skarshaugane Peaks, in the Humboldt Mountains of Queen Maud Land. Discovered and photographed by the German Antarctic Expedition, 1938–39. Mapped by Norway from air photos and surveys by Norwegian Antarctic Expedition, 1956–60, and named Skeidsnutane.

References 

Mountains of Queen Maud Land
Humboldt Mountains (Antarctica)